The following are the defunct titles in the Music Video Awards Category given by the Mnet Asian Music Awards.

Most Popular Music Video (daesang)
The "Most Popular Music Video" category was a former daesang (or grand prize) award together with the "Music Video of the Year" from 1999 to 2005. Since then, the former was discontinued while the latter was demoted and renamed to "Best Music Video".

Music Video Acting

Music Video Director

See also
 Mnet Asian Music Award for Best Music Video

Notes
 Each year is linked to the article about the Mnet Asian Music Awards held that year.

References

External links
 Mnet Asian Music Awards official website

MAMA Awards